Shamsul Alam Khan Milon, commonly known as Shaheed Dr. Milon, was a Bangladeshi physician and political activist. He was killed on November 27, 1990 allegedly by cadres of the then military ruler Hussain Muhammad Ershad.

Early life and education 
Milon was born on August 21, 1957 at Dhaka. He passed SSC in 1973 and HSC in 1975 from Notre Dame College, Dhaka. Then he was enrolled in Dhaka Medical College to study Medicine. He passed MBBS in 1983. He completed M.Phil in Biochemistry in 1988.

Career 
Milon joined at Department of Physiology & Biochemistry in Dhaka Medical College as lecturer. He had been serving at that post till his death. He was the then Joint secretary of Bangladesh Medical Association.

Death 
At the height of 1990 Mass Uprising in Bangladesh, Milon was killed by gunmen of the then military dictator Hussain Muhammad Ershad near Teacher-Student Centre (TSC), University of Dhaka on November 27, 1990.

On that day, Milon, accompanied by Mostofa Jalal Mohiuddin were heading for the then IPGMR to attend a meeting arranged by Bangladesh Medical Association by a rickshaw. Milon was shot while crossing TSC of University of Dhaka. He was rushed to Dhaka Medical College Hospital but doctors declared him dead.

Impact of death 
The death of Milon ignited a wide spread uprising amid the anti-autocracy movement. It prompted the dethroning of military ruler cum politician Hussain Muhammad Ershad  on December 6, 1990, only a few days after Milon's assassination.

Shaheed Dr. Milon day 

The day of his death is observed each year as Shaheed Dr. Milon Day by all political parties in Bangladesh since 1991.

References 

1957 births
1990 deaths
Physicians from Dhaka
Notre Dame College, Dhaka alumni
20th-century Bangladeshi physicians